The 2011 Muar kindergarten hostage crisis took place at the Serikids Kindergarten in Muar, Johor, Malaysia on 7 July 2011. About 30 preschool children aged between 2 and 6 years old and four teachers of the kindergarten in Sungai Abong were held hostages starting at 9:15 a.m. Malaysian time (UTC+8), by Lau Hui Chung, also known as Loi Hui Chung and Ah Teong, aged 40, who had barged into the double-storey building wielding a machete and hammer, and was suspected to be mentally deranged and a drug addict. The siege began when police arrived at 10:00 a.m. after receiving a tip-off. He threatened to kill the hostages if his demand to negotiate with the Prime Minister and be given a gun was not met. He was reported to be emotional and suicidal at times. The Special Actions Unit or Unit Tindakan Khas (UTK) of the Royal Malaysia Police (RMP), firetruck and ambulance were deployed on stand-by to face the crisis amid police's negotiation and persuasion effort by suspect family members. The over six-hour stand-off ended exactly at 4:00 p.m. after UTK members stormed the building at 3:40 p.m. with tear gas and shot the suspect in the head. The suspect was taken to the nearby Sultanah Fatimah Specialist Hospital (HPSF) where he was pronounced dead at 9:15 p.m. All 30 kindergarten children and four teachers were unharmed. The police have investigated a possible connection of the dead suspect with two other similar kindergarten attack cases within the same vicinity earlier, namely Warna Sari Kindergarten on 12 January 2009 and Senario Kindergarten on 10 March 2010. The incident has received nationwide and international media coverage. The police have also instructed kindergartens and day-care centres in the area to tighten their security following the hostage drama. The kindergarten involved was re-opened a week after the incident.

See also
 Special Actions Unit (Malaysia) - Publicly known missions
 List of hostage crises
 List of unsuccessful attacks related to schools
 List of attacks related to primary school and kindergarten incidents
 List of school-related attacks

External links

Notes

References 

2011 crimes in Malaysia
July 2011 crimes
Hostage taking in Malaysia
Attacks on schools in Malaysia 
Operations involving Malaysian special forces
Muar District
Knife attacks